Curtis J. Tarver II is a Democratic member of the Illinois House of Representatives for the 25th district. The Chicago-based district includes all or parts of East Side, Hyde Park, Kenwood, South Chicago, South Shore, and Woodlawn. He serves as the Seargent-at-Arms for the Illinois Legislative Black Caucus.

In the 2018 Democratic primary, Tarver defeated eight other candidates in the heavily Democratic district to succeed longtime Representative Barbara Flynn Currie. Tarver is an attorney who attended Iowa State University and the University of Iowa College of Law.

As of July 3, 2022, Representative Tarver is a member of the following Illinois House committees:

 (Chairman of) Civil Procedure & Tort Liability Subcommittee (HJUA-CIVI)
 Energy & Environment Committee (HENG)
 Income Tax Subcommittee (HREF-INTX)
 Judiciary - Civil Committee (HJUA)
 Property Tax Subcommittee (HREF-PRTX)
 Redistricting Committee (HRED)
 Revenue & Finance Committee (HREF)

Electoral history

References

External links
 Campaign website

21st-century American politicians
African-American state legislators in Illinois
Iowa State University alumni
Lawyers from Chicago
Politicians from Chicago
University of Iowa College of Law alumni
Year of birth missing (living people)
Democratic Party members of the Illinois House of Representatives
Living people
21st-century African-American politicians